Matthew T. Cronin (September 1868 – October 23, 1931) was an American politician. Cronin served in office from 1912 to 1914 as the 10th mayor of Bayonne, New Jersey. As mayor of Bayonne, he was succeeded by Bert J. Daly.

Political career
Cronin succeeded John J. Cain in the Democratic primaries and went on to win the general election for mayor of Bayonne, New Jersey. Most notably, he was responsible in improving Bayonne's water supply during his term. He ran for a second term as Bayonne's mayor but ultimately lost to Bert J. Daly in the democratic primaries. Daly went on to become the 11th mayor of Bayonne.

Personal life
Cronin was a member of the Roman Catholic Church. His wife was Mae Cronin (née Mae Elizabeth McCurry).

Death and burial
Cronin died in his home on 23 October 1931. His funeral mass was held at St. Vincent's Roman Catholic Church in Bayonne. He was interred at the Holy Cross Cemetery, a Roman Catholic cemetery located at 3620 Tilden Avenue, East Flatbush, Brooklyn, New York City.

References

External links
 Bayonne Library Archives

1931 deaths
Mayors of Bayonne, New Jersey
1868 births